Taja Kramberger (born 11 September 1970) is a Slovenian poet, translator, essayist and historical anthropologist from Slovenia. She lives in France.

Kramberger was born in Ljubljana, Slovenia. She completed undergraduate studies in history at the University of Ljubljana, where she also studied archaeology, abandoning this latter when she became engaged in the literary field (1995). She enrolled postgraduate history studies in 1997 and was from then on until 2010 (when a university purge of critical intellectuals was executed at the University of Primorska) a steady and active member of the university research, editorial and pedagogical circles in Slovenia. She obtained her PhD in 2009 in history/historical anthropology at the University of Primorska with a thesis entitled Memory and Remembrance. Historical Anthropology of the Canonized Reception.

She was an initiator and for ten years editor-in-chief of Monitor ISH-Review of Humanities and Social Sciences (2001–2003), in 2004 renamed to Monitor ZSA-Review for Historical, Social and Other Anthropologies (2004–2010). Between 2004 and 2007 she was president of the TROPOS-Association for Historical, Social and Other Anthropologies and for Cultural Activities (Ljubljana, Slovenia).

She publishes monographs in the areas of epistemology of social sciences and historiography, history and historical anthropology of various subjects for the period from the 18th to mid-20th centuries. She is also an internationally acclaimed writer. Kramberger writes literary books, literary studies and essays. She translates texts from all these fields from English, French, Italian, and Spanish into Slovenian.

She also publishes scientific and literary articles, essays and translations. She participates in international scientific and literary conferences, research projects, and is a member of professional associations and organizations. Kramberger has helped to organize international conferences, for example Territorial and Imaginary Frontiers and Identities from Antiquity until Today, accent on Balkans (2002 in Ljubljana) and the international scientific conference of the Francophonie (AUF) titled /History of Oblivion (2008 in Koper).

Her research fields are: epistemology of historiography and social sciences, historical anthropology, contemporary history from the Enlightenment to the mid-20th century, transmission and politics of memory/oblivion, intellectual history and cultural transfers in Europe, anti-intellectualism, dimensions and representations of the Dreyfus Affair in Slovenian social space and in Trieste, mechanisms of social exclusion, extermination, genocide and Shoah/Holocaust studies, anthropology of sex and gender, constitution of (national and transnational) literary fields in Europe in the 19th and 20th centuries, studies of province and provincialism as a specific socio-historical phenomenon.

Since October 2012 she has lived in France together with her husband Drago Braco Rotar, professor of sociology, historical anthropology, translator and a renowned public intellectual in Slovenia and Yugoslavia – who during the 1980s and early 1900s established many key institutions in Slovenia and led them for years, including the now classical green translation edition Studia humanitatis, the first private postgraduate school ISH-Institutum Studiorum Humanitatis, Faculty of Graduate Studies in Human Sciences, where he designed and launched the program of historical anthropology).

Biography 

Born in Ljubljana, Kramberger spent her childhood (between the ages of four and eleven) at the seaside – in the bilingual old-Venetian town of Koper-Capodistria near Trieste. She finished four years of primary school there (Pinko Tomažič), and then moved with family to Ljubljana. There she completed primary and secondary school at Gimnazija Bežigrad. She obtained her BA in history at the University of Ljubljana (1997), and took a position as a postgraduate young researcher at the Institutum Studiorum Humanitatis (ISH) in Ljubljana. There she founded the anthropological journal Monitor ISH which was later in 2004 appropriated by others at the ISH, though the journal and its founding editorial board continued to publish the journal under the name Monitor ZSA outside the institution. After the transition changes, when lucrative and socially applicable science was placed in the first plan at the ISH, she has – among a dozen others – left the institution (2004), and moved with Rotar to Koper-Capodistria, where a new University of Primorska has begun. There Kramberger, together with Rotar, established the historical anthropology program from undergraduate to postgraduate level in the Department of Anthropology. The program was accredited by the state and worked really well, as both teachers were liked by the students, and their classrooms always full, until the university purge in 2010.

Beside in literature and historical anthropology Kramberger continues to be engaged in civil actions and confrontations against clientelism and corruption in the scientific domain in Slovenia. In May 2000, together with Sabina Mihelj, she co-directed a large public manifestation with cultural program in Ljubljana against the corrupted politics of the Ministry of Science and Technology. In 2004 she fought against the illegal takeover of the institution ISH and insisted on publishing all crucial documents, personal testimonies of the takeover as well as reflections of the events from the perspective of the people who finally left the ISH from indignation with their ex-colleagues. In 2010 she again was an active militant against the total neoliberalization, venalization and degradation of the university as an autonomous institution and against the decomposition of its fundamental scientific disciplines at the Faculty of Human Sciences Koper, University of Primorska.

The same regressive social changes occurred simultaneously also in the literary field in Slovenia. In 2004 writer and translator Iztok Osojnik, as a director of the Vilenica International Literary Festival, was ousted from the position of Vilenica's director of the Slovene Writers' Association (SWA). She was among the tiny minority who supported him against mostly state-implemented and state-maintained elite and all-regime-supported writers and authors. Meanwhile the majority of writers remained quiet – also around two then ardently debated subjects of growing nationalism and humiliation of women writers and translators in the frames of the SWA. After that Kramberger distanced herself from the SWA network. She writes and translates literature by her own vocation and ethical standards.

Since living in France (from 2012) she also stepped out of the SWA with an open letter in December 2014 (denied by all Slovene mass-media and suppressed by the president of the SWA) representing only herself and her apatrid chair in Paris. As she writes in one of her poems: Nothing remains./ But life is still here,/ and it speaks the guerrilla alphabet. (...) I am without home,/ I belong to / the invisible community of the banished./ Remove the ethnic adjective / from my name.

History, historical anthropology

Conceptualization of the collective memory and its distinctions from remembrance and history 

Kramberger introduced studies of collective memory, based on Halbwachsian instrumentarium and numerous later improvements of this conceptualization into the Slovenian university sphere, mostly composed of linear descriptive social sciences and humanities and hostile towards any changes. In 2000–2001 she held a course entitled Conceptualization of the collective memory on conceptual differences of Maurice Halbwachs, Frances Amelia Yates, Pierre Nora and Aleida Assmann at the Institutum Studiorum Humanitatis in Ljubljana. With this the theoretical aspect of the Halbwachs' differentiated concept (one of his most important intellectual achievements in life) was ruined for the Slovene readers. Still some rare researchers seem to understand the distinction (among them Marija Jurič Pahor and Samuel Friškič), so they were able to grasp the further categorical substantial differences between the notions of memory and history. However, Kramberger's works expose her incontestably broad knowledge, highly pertinent argumentation and subtle discursive skills, which are not easy to contest.

Critical reflexivity of the Slovenian historiography 
Kramberger has also started with the extensive categorical critical reflexivity in the field of history in Slovenia, and has released many angry reactions in the history field, but mostly she left the historians – unable to confront their own shadows from the past – silenced. Although polemic, which would definitely clarify the discipline's past erratic wanderings and amnesias and an almost total theoretic oblivion in the field of history in Slovenia, is not a usual tool of scientific communication in these regions, it is nevertheless clear that Kramberger has opened (among some other researchers, such as Drago Braco Rotar, Rastko Močnik, Maja Breznik, Lev Centrih, Primož Krašovec, in a small, theoretically much less pertinent part also Marta Verginella and Oto Luthar) an important segment of future debates, which are needed to elucidate some of the neglected and spontaneously transmitted chapters of the Slovenian (distinctly ethnocentric and Sonderweg) history.

Representations and aspects of the Dreyfus Affair in the Slovenophone World 

Kramberger was also the first Slovenian historian to write about various dimensions and echoes of the Dreyfus Affair in the Slovenian social space during the affair and later. She has opened up a complex theme of anti-Semitism neglected and only partially elucidated in the Slovene history. She connected this exclusive phenomenon to the categories and imaginary and specific discursive practices. Introducing a research seminar at the undergraduate level, she exposed how anti-Semitic discursive formations can mobilize people and public opinion in countries with few Jewish people. She demonstrated how, even in social spaces with a scarce population of Jews, strong mechanisms of social exclusion nonetheless operate smoothly – often even more aggressively and viscerally than in bigger countries. In the framework of this theme she directed – together with her students in 2007–2008 and 2008–2009 – an ample exhibition on the Dreyfus Affair (1894–1906), showing its entangled and differentiated European , its highly important civic extensions, and its specific reception in the continental Centro-European spaces of Slovenia and Trieste. The latter two were mostly based on spontaneous, normalized and career-promising anti-Semitism, though not at all innocuous. The exhibitions were set up and shown to the public in Koper (2008), Trieste (2009), Maribor (2010) and Murska Sobota (2011).

Kramberger has implemented many fresh intellectual ideas, pedagogical and theoretical innovations (rather bothersome for the Slovenian socio-political and 'intellectual' common sense). In addition, she has written numerous critical articles on various aspects of Slovenian history and cultural life, but also on broader European history and culture, e.g. the Spanish Civil War, different models of the Enlightenment in Europe and the recurrent Enlightenment features in the works of Anton Tomaž Linhart, epistemic divergence between the Enlightenment's and Historismus's paradigms of historiography, anthropology of translation, the history of university and the formation of university habitus Habitus, literary and cultural fields Pierre Bourdieu ( in the 1930s in Slovenia (by then partially covered by the administrative unit of Dravska Banovina) and on the role of women in the constitution of these fields, etc. For years lecturing a course on social and anthropological aspects of women's history and gender constructions, she translated Michelle Perrot's classic work Women or the Silences of History into Slovenian.

Bourdieuian studies in the frames of Slovenia 

Her intellectual trajectory is partly connected to the Bourdieuian perspective and apparatus in social sciences. She has written about Pierre Bourdieu and Loïc Wacquant, translated some of their texts (as a guest editor of the journal Družboslovne razprave, no. 43, 2003), and in 2006 edited a monograph titled Principles of Reflexive Social Science and for a Critical Investigation of Symbolic Dominations (in Slovenian, together with Drago Braco Rotar). She held lectures – among other subjects – on Bourdieuian approach, instrumentarium and methodology at the University of Primorska in Koper.

Literature

Poetry 

She has published eight books of poetry. Her poems have been translated in more than twenty-five languages and published in different literary journals, anthologies in Slovenia and abroad. Book selections of her poetry came out in Hungarian (Pécs, 2008) and Croatian (Naklada Lara, Zagreb, 2008, tr. Ksenija Premur). She has been an invited guest of around 100 international literary meetings and festivals in Europe (Belgium, England, Lithuania, Portugal, Croatia, Latvia, France, Hungary, Italy, Austria, Germany, Croatia, North Macedonia, France, Lithuania, Finland, Ireland, etc.) and Canada (Quebec and Ontario).

Kramberger, as the committee of the Veronika Award (2007) for the best poetry collection of 2006 wrote, is one of the strongest and most accomplished poetic voices in contemporary Slovenian poetry; a voice which introduces many innovations "so in the poetic proceedings as in the audacity of the chosen subjects, but also in the courage to tell things in an intelligent and a deeply moving way, which does not follow the predominant poetry models, but supplies itself outside of them, in a everyday situations ...". Simple words, entangled with highly elaborated intellectual comprehensions – another benefit of Kramberger's poetic language, in Kramberger's poems change themselves into "multilayered compositions" and subtle messages. These are "able to reach out to the world, and are surely not here for the intimacy of the poet" and neither for sentimental grounds of the reader. And still this poetry is deeply moving, at the same moment emotionally charged and brightly intelligible, light-coloured in spite of breathtaking "gestuary of crime" denuded by Kramberger's verses, as Osojnik observed in her later poetry book in which the poet is narrating the Dreyfuss Affair through the cycle of poems (2009). These features, together with the poet's precious "poetically analytical mind", which is able to convert a "stale literary canon and criticism into an inspiration for the highest level of poetry", are innovations, so says the Veronika Award committee, which "give her poetry a seal of world importance and actuality" (Explanation for the Veronika Award 2007).

Jad Hatem, a French poet himself and a professor of philosophy and literature Jad Hatem, in an original way also noticed that a privileged topos in Krambeger's poetry is her outstanding ability of a simultaneous theoretic reflection, inscribed along with the poetic thought of her poems (2010). From a very different angle, Slovenian poet Iztok Osojnik sees this rare privilege, that is the poet's critical ability to transform ideologically contaminated and narrow representations of reality in a poetic way into more bearable representations of reality, which bring us much closer to the core of events, as a tool of the political poetry in its best and noble sense (Apokalipsa, no. 134/135).

Translations, organizations of cultural events 
Next to numerous translated poems and some prose texts of other writers published in journals, she translated into Slovene a poetry book by Italian poet Michele Obit (ZTT EST, Trieste, 2001), a selection of poetry by Argentinian poet Roberto Juarroz for the book  (Vertical Poetry – with her introduction, ŠZ, Ljubljana, 2006), a book by Gao Xingjian (/Buying a Fishing Rod for My Grandfather, 1986–1990, from French together with Drago Braco Rotar) (Didakta, Radovljica, 2001), a book of poetry written by Lithuanian poet Neringa Abrutyte (CSK, Aleph, Ljubljana, 2004) and a book of fairy tales for kids by Lucy Coats (/Atticus the Storyteller, 2004; MK, Ljubljana, 2004, reprinted in 2009).

At the ISH – Graduate School of Humanities in Ljubljana, Kramberger arranged an exhibition place for fine arts and between 2000 and 2003 organized five exhibitions of Slovenian and of foreign figurative artists (painters, photographic artists, designers, installation artists).

In 2002, Kramberger directed and coordinated an international project of poets and translators (22 from 10 countries),  / Different Languages /  / , in the seaside town of Ankaran near Koper in Slovenia. The project established a series of translation workshops between 1999 and 2004 in Central Europe (Bulgaria, Hungary, Slovenia, Italy and Austria). In 2004 the publication  /  / Different Languages /  in 10 languages came out of the project. It was published by the Edition Libris Koper and edited by Kramberger and Gašper Malej. Anne Talvaz, a French writer and translator, and Bulgarian translator Stefka Hrusanova have broadened the scope of the workshop and organized presentations in Spain (Barcelona) and Italy (Milan) in 2008 and 2010.

Another large international project Kramberger conducted in 2006 was a Slovenian segment of the international project Sealines /  / , which through one-month literary residences in six European bilingual ports (Cardiff, Galway, Helsinki, Koper, Riga, and Valletta) connected writers from six European states. The project was supported by the program Culture 2000 of the European Union, and was led by the LAF – Literature Across Frontiers office in UK, Manchester. In Slovenia it was executed by the Association Tropos and its then-president Kramberger.

From 2007 to 2009, Kramberger was a president of the Collegium artium (CA) – an association of teachers and students at the Faculty of Human Sciences Koper, University of Primorska, aimed at organizing different cultural and social events at the faculty (literary readings, music concerts, theater and film performances, round tables, conferences, commemorations, exhibitions of figurative arts, other specialized exhibitions etc.). In the frames of the institution CA more than 150 cultural events took place in less than two years.

Essays, studies and criticism 
Her essays and introductory studies to the other poets (Roberto Juarroz, Michele Obit, Gašper Malej) mark quite a different approach from other Slovenian literary critics. They are attentive analyses of poetic language and imaginary constellation behind it. With the essay titled   (. On the Kercopian Literary Criticism in the Slovenian Literary Field), written with a rare combination of fine irony and piercing analytical style, on drastically unreflexive criticism in Slovenian literature she has shown how important it is for a critic to be disposable and open to the artistic work and at the same time able to produce analytical distances in relation to the work read and evaluated, and in the next step to compound both experiences into a certain perspective, which can come out as his/her own distinctive approach and a singular way of seeing things and works of art. Without that (minimal) cognitive engagement, to Kramberger there can be no artistic criticism, but only an unconscious and ritualized activity – she calls it a Kercopian literary criticism – that is a (grinning) mimesis of common sense and stereotypes about literature and authors.

In her interviews she talks about cognitive dimensions of literature and their transformational potential in a society. Transformational discourses and discursive practices, which are open to changes and interventions, as the opposite of the transformational discourses with closed semantic structure and clear signs of mental immobility are original analytical categories of her conceptualization and apparatus. In scholarly texts (cf. her article Doxa et fama, 2003, her dissertation, or her interview for the journal Literatura in 2006) Kramberger further identifies transfirmational discourses as the systemic feature of the  provincial mental structure, unable to subdue itself to changes and open to the external/outer world. Kramberger is among those few Slovenian writers (Iztok Osojnik, Miklavž Komelj, in a way also Barbara Korun) who are studiously oriented, and do not recognize (pure) inspiration as a sufficient cause for creative artistic work. In their artistic work there is a strong component of social sensitivity and a constant ethical reference to attain the equilibrium of social justice.

Nominations, awards, fellowships

Literary 
 September 1997: final circle nomination for the Book Fair Award for the First Literary Book
 November 1998: final circle nomination for the Jenko Award
 Spring 2001: Literary Fellowship of the Bibliophilic Edition Thanhäuser in Ottensheim & KulturKontakt Austria
 2005: State Fellowship (Ministry of Culture, Republic of Slovenia) for the topmost artistic achievements in Slovenia
 2007: Veronika Award, Celje (for the poetry book Everyday Conversations, 2006)

Scholarly 
 1998: Paris (École d’Automne: L’État et le Politique. Histoire et nouveaux modèles)
 2001: Budapest (in April: 4th International Winter School at  Multiple Antiquities–Multiple Modernities)
 2001–2002: Paris (MSH)
 2003: Budapest (five months junior fellow at the Collegium Budapest Institute for Advanced Study)
 2005–2006: Paris (MSH EHESS)

Works

Poetry 
  (Marzipan), 1997 (in Slovene)
  (The Sea Says), 1999 (in Slovene)
 / (Contra-Courant), 2001 (in German, Edition Thanhäuser, Ottensheim)
  (Velure Indigo), 2004 (in Slovene)
 //Mobilisations/ in 2004–2005 (in Slovene, French, English, and Italian)
  (Everyday Conversations) in 2006 (in Slovene)
  in 2009 (poetic echos to the Deyfus Affair, in Slovene)
 ♣ ♣♣ ♣♣♣♣♣ni♣♣ in 2010 (blackout poetry from a Constitution of RS and some other legal texts, in Slovene).

Literary studies, essays and criticism 
 "" ("Aberrations in Slovenian Poetry: Woman and Knowledge. Some theses on reactionary revolution to which we bear witness"), Literatura, July/August 2003, vol. 15, no. 145/146, 1–9.
 "" ("Poems, that you share with rain"), an introductory study to the poetry book of Gašper Malej, in: Gašper Malej, Otok, slutnje, poljub, (Zbirka Lambda, 39). Ljubljana, Škuc, 2004, 110–133.
 "" ("Where there's no cognitive reality, there can be neither history [of women] nor selfconscious society"), Apokalipsa, 2005, no. 90/91/92, 103–119.
 "", ("Where the writing infects the landscape") an introductory study to the Slovenian translation of the selected poems of the Argentinian poet Roberto Juarroz, in: Robeto Juarroz, Vertikalna poezija, (Knjižna zbirka Beletrina). Ljubljana, Študentska založba, 2006, 181–222.
 "Strangoliert!", Apokalipsa, September–November 2007, no. 113/115, 1-23.
 ". " ("Similis simili gaudet. On the Kercopian Literary Criticism in the Slovenian Literary Field"), Poetikon, no. 19/20, 2008, 150–193.

Literary editorship 
 2004: Co-editor with Gašper Malej of the collection  / Linguaggi di-versi, publication of the Poets' and Translators' Workshop  / , held in Ankaran, Slovenia, in 2002. The project  continued with some pauses from 1998 to 2009), Knjigarna Libris, Koper, 221 p.
 2004:  Editor of public documentation and texts in connection to the literary polemics in summer 2004, concerning many issues, including an Open letter to the Minister of Culture Mrs. Andreja Rihter written by the literary creators on 6 July 2004: Dosjeji I, Apokalipsa, 2004, no. 84/85, 139–182.
 2006: Editor and translator of selected poems by the Argentinian poet Roberto Juarroz, Vertikalna poezija, (Knjižna zbirka Beletrina). Ljubljana, Študentska založba, 2006. 224 p. .
 2008: Literary editor of the portraits and presentations of poet Joël Pourbaix, short-story writer Hiromi Goto and novelist Dionne Brand, Monitor ZSA, 2008, vol. 10, no. 3/4, 141–151, 153–159, 160–166.

Scholarly research

Principal publications 
 Taja Kramberger and Drago Braco Rotar (dir. and co-tr.),  [Principles for a Reflexive Social Science and for a Critical Investigation of Symbolic Dominations], (translations of Pierre Bourdieu's and Loïc Wacquant's selected texts), Library Annales Majora, Koper, University of Primorska, Publishing House Annales, 2006, 262 p., .
 Taja Kramberger,  (Historiographical Divergence: the Enlightenment and Historismus Paradigm: On an Opened and a Closed Epistemic Structure and Their Elaborations), Library Annales Majora, Koper, University of Primorska, Publishing House Annales, 2007, 384 p., 
 Taja Kramberger,  (Historico-anthropological Formation of the University Habiti/), Pedagoški institut, Ljubljana, 2009, 131 p.
 Taja Kramberger and Drago Braco Rotar,  (University: Collegium or Training? On the University Autonomy and its Contraries), Univerza v Ljubljani, Ljubljana, 2010. In preparation for print.
 Taja Kramberger and Drago Braco Rotar,  (Think the Society, which does not think (by) itself), Založba Sophia, Ljubljana, 2010. In preparation for print.

Selection of articles 
 Taja Kramberger and Drago Rotar, "" (Rights vs Tolerance. Incongruity of Mentalities: Historico-anthropological Marginalia on Slovenian Translation of the Declaration of the Rights of Man and the Citizen from 26 August 1789),  / School Field, vol. XXI, no. 3–4, 2010, 36 p.
 Taja Kramberger and Drago Rotar, "" (Europe Goes to Shanghai. Invasion of neoliberalism and churches in the academic world), vol. XVI, no. 4, 2010, 31 p.
 Taja Kramberger and Drago Rotar, "" (Insanity of Measurement. On the Deteriorated Use of Scientific Tools), /School Field, vol. XXI, no.  1–2, 2010, 42 p.
 Taja Kramberger, "" ( / ).  12. februarja 2010, Koper: Zveza borcev Koper-Capodistria, 2010, 100–140.
 Taja Kramberger, "", in: VAUDAY, Patrick (ur.), MOČNIK, Rastko (ur.), ZUPANC EĆIMOVIĆ, Paula (ur.), ROTAR, Drago B. (ur.). , (Knjižnica Annales Majora). Koper: Université de Primorska, Centre de recherches scientifiques, Maison d'édition Annales: Société d'historie de Primorska Sud, 2009, 189–213. [COBISS.SI-ID 1752275]
 Taja Kramberger, "" (From the History of Intellectuals : the Dreyfus Affair and French Historians), Monitor ZSA, 2008, vol. 10, no. 1/2, pp. 25–81, ilustr. [COBISS.SI-ID 1592275]
 Taja Kramberger, "" (The Dreyfus Affair and Printed Media), Media Watch, 2008.
 Taja Kramberger and Drago Rotar, "". In: KRAMBERGER, Taja & ROTAR, Drago B. (dir.), BOURDIEU, Pierre, WACQUANT, Loïc, (Knjižnica Annales Majora). Koper: Univerza na Primorskem, Znanstveno-raziskovalno središče, Založba Annales: Zgodovinsko društvo za južno Primorsko, 2006, 9–34. [COBISS.SI-ID 1213651]
 Taja Kramberger, Sabina Mihelj and Drago Rotar, "Representations of the Nation and of the Other in the Slovenian Periodical Press before and after 1991: Engagements and Implications", In: SPASSOV, Orlin (ur.), Quality press in Southeast Europe, (The media in Southeast Europe), 1st ed. Sofia: , 2004, 276–305. [COBISS.SI-ID 216577280]
 Taja Kramberger, "", August 2003, vol. 19, no. 43, 49–55. [COBISS.SI-ID 595667]
 Taja Kramberger, " Joining the Club "/"From Joining the Club to the Grotesque Slovenian Adaptation to Neoliberalisme"/"", vol. 19, no. 43, August 2003, 77–95. [COBISS.SI-ID 595923]
 Taja Kramberger, ""/, Monitor ISH, vol. IV, no. 1–4, 2002, 53–70. [COBISS.SI-ID 21359202]
 Taja Kramberger, "Doxa et fama. "/"Doxa et fama. On production of "Public opinion" and Strategies of Oblivion"/"Doxa et fama. ", vol. XVIII, no. 41, December 2002, 63–100. [COBISS.SI-ID 20786018]
 Taja Kramberger, "" (Maurice Halbwachs and the social frames of collective memory/); . In: HALBWACHS, Maurice.  [ , ]. Ljubljana: Studia humanitatis, 2001, 211–258. [COBISS.SI-ID 694925]

Scholarly editorship 
 2001–2010: Editor-in-chief of Monitor ISH (2001–2003), in 2004 renamed to Monitor ZSA – Revue of Historical, Social and Other Anthropologies (34 numbers)
 2003: Guest-editor for the theme "Deconstruction of neoliberalism"/"",  [Dissertations in Social Sciences], vol. XIX, no. 43, 2003, pp. 47–95.
 2006: Co-editor (with Drago braco Rotar) and co-translator in the Slovenian collection of articles by Pierre Bourdieu and Loïc Wacquant,  [Principles for a Reflexive Social Science and for a Critical Investigation of Symbolic Dominations], (translations of Pierre Bourdieu's and Loïc Wacquant's texts), Library Annales Majora, Koper, University of Primorska, Publishing House Annales, 2006, 262 p., .
 2009: Member of the Scientific Committee in publication: Patrick Vauday, Rastko Močnik, Paula Zupanc Ećimović, Drago Rotar (dir.), Library Annales Majora, Koper, University of Primorska, Publishing House Annales, 2009, 456 p.

Literary references 
 Jean Boase-Beier, Alexandra Büchler, Fiona Sampson, A Line: New Poetry from Eastern and Central Europe (anthology with a preface by Václav Havel), Arc Publications, UK, 2004, . URL: https://web.archive.org/web/20110727062630/http://www.arcpublications.co.uk/biography.htm?writer_id=228
 Vid Sagadin, "Iskanje nezasičenih prostorov", Literatura, vol. 17, no. 169–170, July/August 2005, 224–229.
 Peter Semolič, "Sensibility and sharp intellect", Introductory essay of the Poetry International Web, 2005.URL: http://slovenia.poetryinternationalweb.org/piw_cms/cms/cms_module/index.php?obj_id=5026
 Irena Novak Popov, Antologija slovenskih pesnic 3, 1981 – 2000 [Anthology of Slovenian Women Poets 3, 1981 – 2000], Založba Tuma, Ljubljana, 2007, 318–329.
 Jad Hatem, " La pierre de l'invisibilité ", La Poésie slovène contemporaine : l'écriture de la pierre (Portraites littéraires), Éditions du Cygne, Paris, 2010, 11–24.
 Iztok Osojnik, "Pet dni na ladji norcev" [Five days at the Ship of Fools], Apokalipsa, no. 134/135, 2009, 285–295.
 Colleen Mc Carthy, "Storm in Words: Contemporary Slovenian Poetry in Translation", Talisman. A Journal of Contemporary Poetry and Poetics, no. 38/39/40, Summer-Autumn 2010, 350–355.

See also 
 Slovenian literature
 List of Slovenian historians
 Slovene Writers' Association

References

External links 
 Personal web-site in the form of blog
 CV of Taja Kramberger at the Faculty of Human Sciences University of Primorska (Littoral)
 Poetry International Web: http://slovenia.poetryinternationalweb.org/piw_cms/cms/cms_module/index.php?obj_id=5044
  Interview for the web Journal Transcript
 Interview for the web Journal Transcript
 Interview: Brezmejna neumnost province (Infinite stupidity of province), Večer, 19 June 2004, 42

1970 births
Living people
Writers from Ljubljana
Slovenian women poets
Slovenian poets
Slovenian translators
Italian–Slovene translators
Spanish–Slovene translators
21st-century Slovenian historians
University of Ljubljana alumni
Veronika Award laureates
University of Primorska alumni
Women historians
Academic staff of the University of Primorska